Corey Allan Brown (born November 26, 1985) is an American former professional baseball center fielder. He played in Major League Baseball (MLB) for the Washington Nationals and Boston Red Sox.

Career

Amateur
Prior to playing professionally, Brown attended Plant High School and then Oklahoma State University. In his first year with Oklahoma State, in 2005, Brown hit .360 with 13 home runs and 46 RBI in 55 games. The following year, he hit .347 with 13 home runs and 40 RBI, stealing 14 bases. After the 2006 season, he played collegiate summer baseball with the Chatham A's of the Cape Cod Baseball League. Brown played his final season with Oklahoma State in 2007, hitting .335 with 22 home runs, 71 RBI and 23 stolen bases.

Oakland Athletics
He was drafted by the Oakland Athletics in the first round of the 2007 amateur draft and began his professional career that season.

Brown played for the Vancouver Canadians in 2007, hitting .268 with 11 home runs and 48 RBI in 59 games. In 2008, he played for both the Kane County Cougars (85 games, 14 home runs) and the Stockton Ports (49 games, 16 home runs), hitting a combined .266 with 30 home runs, 83 RBI and 16 stolen bases. In 2009, Brown spent his entire year with the Midland RockHounds, hitting .268 with nine home runs and 43 RBI. He split 2010 between the RockHounds and Sacramento River Cats, hitting a combined .283 with 15 home runs, 69 RBI and 22 stolen bases.

Washington Nationals
On December 16, 2010 Brown, with pitcher Henry Rodriguez were traded to the Washington Nationals for Josh Willingham.

He made his major league debut for the Washington Nationals on September 6, 2011, appearing in three games during the season, pinch-hitting three times, without getting on base.

Brown's first major league hit was a home run, which he hit on July 28, 2012, against the Milwaukee Brewers in the fourth inning.

On December 12, 2013, the Nationals designated Brown for assignment after the signing of outfielder Nate McLouth.

Second Stint With A's
On December 19, 2013, the Nationals traded Brown to the Oakland Athletics for cash considerations. The Athletics designated Brown for assignment in January 2014, when they signed Eric O'Flaherty.

Boston Red Sox
Brown signed a minor league deal with the Boston Red Sox on January 31, 2014. On August 16, 2014, the Red Sox designated Brown for assignment, after he appeared in three games at the big league level with the club. He elected free agency in October 2014.

Tampa Bay Rays
On December 12, 2014, he signed a minor league deal with the Tampa Bay Rays. He elected free agency on November 6, 2015.

Los Angeles Dodgers
He signed a minor league contract with the Los Angeles Dodgers in January 2016. He was given a non-roster invitation to Dodgers spring training and he was assigned to the Triple-A Oklahoma City Dodgers. With OKC, he played in 116 games and hit .249 with 23 homers and 70 RBI

Toros de Tijuana
On January 24, 2017, Brown signed with the Toros de Tijuana of the Mexican League. He was released on July 31, 2018.

Tigres de Quintana Roo
On August 3, 2018, Brown signed with the Tigres de Quintana Roo of the Mexican League. He became a free agent after the season.

References

External links

 

1985 births
Living people
American expatriate baseball players in Canada
American expatriate baseball players in Mexico
Baseball players from Tampa, Florida
Boston Red Sox players
Bravos de Margarita players
American expatriate baseball players in Venezuela
Chatham Anglers players
Durham Bulls players
Kane County Cougars players
Leones del Escogido players
American expatriate baseball players in the Dominican Republic
Major League Baseball outfielders
Mexican League baseball right fielders
Mexican League baseball center fielders
Midland RockHounds players
North Shore Honu players
Oklahoma City Dodgers players
Oklahoma State Cowboys baseball players
Pawtucket Red Sox players
Phoenix Desert Dogs players
Sacramento River Cats players
Stockton Ports players
Syracuse Chiefs players
Tigres de Quintana Roo players
Toros de Tijuana players
Vancouver Canadians players
Venados de Mazatlán players
Washington Nationals players
Henry B. Plant High School alumni